The 3rd annual Billboard Latin Music Awards which honor the most popular albums, songs, and performers in Latin music took place in Miami.

Pop

Pop hot latin track of the year

 "Vuélveme a Querer", Cristian Castro

Pop album of the year, Male
"La Carretera", Julio Iglesias

Pop album of the year, female
"Dreaming of You", Selena

Pop album of the year, duo or group
"Por Amor a Mi Pueblo", Marco Antonio Solís y Los Bukis

Pop album of the year, new artist
"Enrique Iglesias", Enrique Iglesias

Pop video of the year
"No Encuentro Un Momento Pa' Olvidar", Miguel Bosé

Tropical/Salsa

Tropical/salsa hot latin track of the year

"Te Conozco Bien", Marc Anthony

Tropical/salsa album of the year, male
"Todo a Su Tiempo", Marc Anthony

Tropical/salsa album of the year, female
"Abriendo Puertas", Gloria Estefan

Tropical/salsa album of the year, duo or group
"Los Dueños del Swing", Los Hermanos Rosario

Tropical/salsa album of the year, new artist
"No Se Parece a Nada", Albita

Tropical/salsa video of the year
"Abriendo Puertas", Gloria Estefan

Regional Mexican

Regional Mexican hot latin track of the year
"Tú Sólo Tú", Selena

Regional Mexican album of the year, male
"Cómo Te Extraño", Pete Astudillo

Regional Mexican album of the year, female
"Joyas de dos siglos", Ana Gabriel

Regional Mexican album of the year, duo or group

"El Ejemplo", Los Tigres del Norte

Regional Mexican album of the year, new artist
"Elida y Avante", Elida y Avante

Regional Mexican video of the year
"Tú Sólo Tú", Selena

Other awards

Hot latin tracks artist of the year
Selena

Latin rap album of the year
"Club 555 ", El General

Latin pop/rock album of the year
"Cuando los Ángeles Lloran", Maná

Contemporary Latin jazz album of the year
"Arturo Sandoval & the Latin Train", Arturo Sandoval

Latin dance single of the year
"Abriendo Puertas", Gloria Estefan

Latin dance album of the year
"Macarena Mix", Various Artists with Los del Río

Rock video of the year
"La Chispa Adecuada", Héroes del Silencio

Songwriter of the year
Marco Antonio Solís

Publisher of the year
BMG Songs, Inc

Publishing corporation of the year
BMG Music Publishing Inc.

Producer of the year
Marco Antonio Solís

Spirit Of Hope
Gloria Estefan

Billboard Lifetime achievement award
José Feliciano

Billboard Latin Music Hall of Fame
Juan Gabriel

References

Billboard Latin Music Awards
Latin Billboard Music Awards
Latin Billboard Music Awards
Billboard Music Awards
Latin Billboard Music